WZBG (97.3 FM) is a radio station broadcasting an Adult Contemporary format. Licensed to Litchfield, Connecticut, United States, it serves the Litchfield area.  The station is owned by Local Girls And Boys Broadcasting Corporation.

External links
 
 
 

Litchfield, Connecticut
ZBG
Radio stations established in 1991
1991 establishments in Connecticut